Deathtrap may refer to:

 Deathtrap (play), a 1978 play by Ira Levin which received a Tony Award nomination for Best Play
 Deathtrap (film), a 1982 film based on the Levin play
 Death Trap, a 1977 film better known as Eaten Alive
 Deathtrap (plot device), a plot device in fiction and drama
 Deathtrap, a hypothetical organism from Extraterrestrial
 "Death Trap" (Star Wars: The Clone Wars), a second-season episode of Star Wars: The Clone Wars
 Deathtrap, a character from Stormwatch, leader of a team of mercenaries
 The Death Trap, a 1984 video game developed and published by Square for the NEC PC-8801, NEC PC-9801, and Fujitsu FM-7
 Will: The Death Trap II, sequel to the previous game
 Deathtrap (video game), a 2015 video game developed and published by NeocoreGames
 "Death Trap", a song by Hawkwind from their 1979 album PXR5
 "Death Trap", a song by Pantera from their 1988 album Power Metal
 "Death Trap", a song by Gravediggaz from their 1997 album 6 Feet Deep
 Death Trap, kind of a stage fatality which occurs in Mortal Kombat during the fight
 A political neologism used to condemn the budget proposal The Path to Prosperity
 Deathtrap, a robot constructed by a character called Gaige to serve as her personal bodyguard in the fictional Borderlands series of games programmed by Gearbox
 A slang term for a consumer product that does not meet safety regulations and may pose a risk of injury or death

See also
 Deathtrap Dungeon, an adventure gamebook by Ian Livingstone
 Deathtrap Dungeon, a 1998 video game